Zindagi Rocks is a Nepalese romantic comedy film. Movie gain its popularity due to its song "chokho maya," which changes the trend of High speed video in Nepal.

It was released on January 2, 2015.

References

Nepalese romantic comedy films
2015 films